Lúcio Soares (31 May 1934, in Manhuaçu – 1988) was a Portuguese footballer who played as defender.

Football career 
Lúcio gained 5 caps for Portugal and made his debut 27 April 1960 in Ludwigshafen against West Germany, in a 1–2 defeat.

External links 
 
 

1934 births
1988 deaths
Portuguese footballers
Association football defenders
Primeira Liga players
Sporting CP footballers
Portugal international footballers
Sportspeople from Minas Gerais